"Freuet euch der schönen Erde" (Enjoy the beautiful Earth) is a Lutheran hymn in German with a text by Philipp Spitta in 1827. In the hymnal Evangelisches Gesangbuch, it appears as EG 510, with a 1928 melody by Frieda Fronmüller.

History 
The text was written by Philipp Spitta, a Lutheran theologian from Lower Saxony, in 1827, when he worked as young private teacher in Lüne near Lüneburg. It describes the beauty of nature as God's creation, comparing it to precious artwork. He wrote five stanzas of four lines each, with the last line repeated.

The text first appeared without a melody in Spitta's song collection Psalter und Harfe (Psalter and harp), subtitled Sammlung christlicher Lieder zur häuslichen Erbauung (Collection of Christian songs for edification at home). The hymn was titled "Die Schönheit der Natur" (The beauty of nature). Several melodies were tried. In 1928, Frieda Fronmüller composed a new melody which was successful with choirs, and was chosen for inclusion in the modern German Protestant hymnal Evangelisches Gesangbuch as EG 510. The hymn also appears in many songbooks.

Text 
The text as in the Protestant hymnal is:

The song has been compared to Paul Gerhardt's "Geh aus, mein Herz, und suche Freud". Both appeared after wars, Spitta's after the Napoleonic Wars, and both reflect the beauty of nature as God's creation. Spitta's text looks at natural beauty in the first and third stanzas, and contrasts it to heavenly beauty described in the second and forth stanzas. The final stanza is a summary, imagining the even greater joy at God's heart ("an seinem Herzen").

Usage 
"Freuet euch der schönen Erde" has been used as a slogan for concerns of ecology and preservation of nature. It is the title of a 2000 book about Christian understanding of nature in history, a booklet for a children's event, and an exhibition about art related to nature, among others.

References

External links 
 4Bibeln: Gesangbuch / Evangelisches Gesangbuch 510 l4a.org
 Christ My Song - 154 / Rejoice in the beautiful earth christmysong.com
 
 Tina Röber-Burzeya: Freuet Euch der schönen Erde (in German) kirchenkreis-burgdorf.de 21 September 2019

19th-century hymns in German
1827 songs